Perdew is a surname. Notable people with the surname include: 

John Perdew (born 1943), American theoretical physicist
Kelly Perdew (born 1967), American businessman

See also
Pardew